Muramotoceras was an unusual genus of heteromorphic ammonite. It was known only from Japan until researchers reported in 2001 that the genus was present in Alaska's Matanuska Formation as well. Its remains likely date to the middle Turonian (from  89.8 to 93.9 million years ago) in both areas. Subsequently it was also described from the Santonian Gosau Group (Austria).

See also
 List of ammonites

Footnotes

References

External links
 Paleotheque

Ammonitida genera
Nostoceratidae
Late Cretaceous ammonites of North America
Ammonites of Asia